The A-League Player of the Month is an association football award that recognises the best adjudged A-League player each month of the season. The winner is chosen by combination of an online public vote.

Key
Position key: GK – Goalkeeper; DF – Defender; MF – Midfielder; FW – Forward.

List of winners

Awards won by nationality

Awards won by position

Awards won by club

References

A-League Men trophies and awards
Association football player of the month awards